Boris Godunov (Borís Godunóv; variant title: Драматическая повесть, Комедия o настоящей беде Московскому государству, o царе Борисе и о Гришке Отрепьеве, A Dramatic Tale, The Comedy of the Distress of the Muscovite State, of Tsar Boris, and of Grishka Otrepyev) is a closet play by Alexander Pushkin. It was written in 1825, published in 1831, but not approved for performance by the censor until 1866 . Its subject is the Russian ruler Boris Godunov, who reigned as Tsar from 1598 to 1605. It consists of 25 scenes and is written predominantly in blank verse.

Modest Mussorgsky's opera, Boris Godunov (1874), is based on this play.

History

Composition
Having finished the play, Pushkin famously wrote to his friend Pyotr Vyazemsky: "What a Pushkin, what a son of a bitch!".

Pushkin wrote of the play: 
The study of Shakespeare, Karamzin, and our old chronicles gave me the idea of clothing in dramatic forms one of the most dramatic epochs of our history. Not disturbed by any other influence, I imitated Shakespeare in his broad and free depictions of characters, in the simple and careless combination of plots; I followed Karamzin in the clear development of events; I tried to guess the way of thinking and the language of the time from the chronicles. Rich sources! Whether I was able to make the best use of them, I don't know – but at least my labors were zealous and conscientious.

Performance

Saint Petersburg premiere
The first performance took place on 17 September 1870 at the Mariinsky Theatre in Saint Petersburg, given by the artists of the Aleksandrinsky Theatre. Production personnel included Aleksandr Yablochkin (regisseur), and Matvey Shishkov (scene designer). The cast included Leonid Leonidov (Boris) [?], Vasiliy Samoylov (the False Dmitriy), Pyotr Grigoryev (Pimen), Yelena Struyskaya (Marina), and Pyotr Zubrov (Shuysky).

Moscow premiere
The Moscow premiere took place on 19 November 1880 at the Maliy Theatre. Production personnel included Sergey Chernevsky (regisseur). The cast included Nikolay Vilde (Boris), Aleksandr Lensky (the False Dmitriy), Ivan Samarin (Pimen), Maria Yermolova (Marina), Osip Pravdin (Shuysky), and Mikhail Lentovsky (Basmanov) .

Later productions
Vsevolod Meyerhold attempted a staging of the play in the 1930s. Meyerhold commissioned Sergei Prokofiev to write incidental music for his production, but when Meyerhold abandoned it under political pressure, the score was abandoned as well .

The original, uncensored play did not receive a première until April 12, 2007, at Princeton University in the United States, and then only in an English translation. This production was based on Meyerhold's design and featured Prokofiev's music, together with supplemental music by Peter Westergaard. Chester Dunning, Caryl Emerson, and Sergei Fomichev's The Uncensored Boris Godunov seeks to rescue Pushkin's play from obscurity.

The Royal Shakespeare Company staged the British premiere of the original 1825 edition at Stratford on Avon in the autumn of 2012. The play had been translated into English by Adrian Mitchell.

Characters

Boris Godunov, boyar, later Tsar
Fyodor, his son
Kseniya, his daughter
Kseniya's Nurse
Prince Shuyskiy, boyar
Prince Vorotinskiy, boyar
Shchelkalov, Secretary of the Duma
Pimen, monk and chronicler
Grigoriy Otrepyev, monk, later Dmitriy, the Pretender
Patriarch, Abbot of the Chudov Monastery.
Misail, wandering monk
Varlaam, wandering monk
Afanasiy Mikhailovich Pushkin, friend of Prince Shuyskiy
Gabriel Pushkin, his nephew
Semyon Nikitich Godunov, secret agent of Boris Godunov
Prince Kurbsky, disgraced boyar
Khrushchov, disgraced boyar
Karela, a Cossack
Prince Vishnevetskiy
Mniszech, Voyevoda of Sambor
Marina, his daughter
Ruzya, her chambermaid
Basmanov, a Russian officer
Marzharet, officer of Boris
Rozen, officer of Boris
Mosalskiy, boyar
Hostess of the Inn
Boyars, People, Peasants, Inspectors, Officers, Attendants, Guests, a Catholic Priest, a Polish Noble, a Poet, an Idiot, a Beggar, Gentlemen, Guards, Soldiers, Ladies, Gentleman, Boys, Servants

Synopsis
Scene 1 – Kremlin Palaces
Scene 2 – Red Square
Scene 3 – Novodevichiy Monastery
Scene 4 – Kremlin Palaces
Scene 5 – Night; A Cell in the Chudov Monastery
Scene 6 – The Fence of the Monastery (Note: Deleted from the published drama)
Scene 7 – Palaces of the Patriarch
Scene 8 – The Tsar's Palaces
Scene 9 – An Inn on the Lithuanian Border
Scene 10 – Moscow; The Home of Shuyskiy
Scene 11 – The Tsar's Palaces
Scene 12 – Kraków; The Home of Vishnevetskiy
Scene 13 – Castle of the Voyevoda Mniszech in Sambor (Note: also deleted from many editions)
Scene 14 – A Suite of Lighted Rooms
Scene 15 – Night; A Garden; A Fountain
Scene 16 – The Lithuanian Frontier
Scene 17 – The Tsar's Duma
Scene 18 – Plain near Novgorod-Seversk
Scene 19 – Square before a Cathedral in Moscow
Scene 20 – Sevsk
Scene 21 – A Forest
Scene 22 – Moscow; The Tsar's Palaces
Scene 23 – A Tent
Scene 24 – Lobnoye Mesto (Red Square)
Scene 25 – The Kremlin; The House of Boris

Historical basis
A familiarity with the historical events surrounding the Time of Troubles – the interregnum period of relative anarchy following the end of the Rurik Dynasty (1598) and preceding the Romanov Dynasty (1613) – may facilitate an understanding of the play. Key events are as follows:

1584 – Ivan IV "The Terrible", the first Grand Prince of Muscovy to use the title Tsar (Caesar), dies. Ivan's successor is his retiring and politically feeble son Fyodor, now Fyodor I, who cares mostly for spiritual matters, and leaves the affairs of state to his capable brother-in-law, boyar Boris Godunov, now de facto regent.
1591 – Ivan's other son Dmitriy dies under mysterious circumstances in Uglich. An investigation, ordered by Godunov and carried out by Prince Vasiliy Shuyskiy, determines that the Tsarevich, while playing with a knife, had an epileptic seizure, fell, and died from a self-inflicted wound to the throat. Dmitriy's mother, Maria Nagaya, exiled with him to Uglich by Godunov, claims he was assassinated. Rumors linking Boris to the crime are circulated by his enemies.
1598 – Tsar Fyodor I dies. He is virtually the last representative of the Ryurik Dynasty that has ruled Russia for seven centuries. Patriarch Job of Moscow nominates Boris to succeed Fyodor I as Tsar, despite the rumors  that Boris ordered the murder of Dmitriy. Boris agrees to ascend the throne only if elected by the Zemskiy Sobor. This the assembly does unanimously, and Boris is crowned the same year.
1604 – A pretender to the throne appears, claiming to be Tsarevich Dmitriy, but believed to be in reality one Grigoriy Otrepyev. He gains the support of the Polish aristocracy, and, obtaining a force of soldiers, he marches on Moscow. Crossing into Russia, Dmitriy's invasion force is joined by disaffected Cossacks. However, after a few victories, it loses momentum.
1605 – Boris dies of unknown causes. He is succeeded by his son Fyodor, now Fyodor II. The death of Boris gives new life to the campaign of the False Dmitriy, who enters Moscow. Boyars who flock to his side murder Fyodor II and his mother.
1606 – False Dmitriy I is murdered, and is succeeded by Vasiliy Shuyskiy, now Vasiliy IV.
1610 – Vasiliy IV is deposed, and dies two years later in a Polish prison. Another pretender claiming to be Dmitriy Ivanovich, False Dmitriy II, is murdered.
1612 – Yet a third pretender, False Dmitriy III, is captured and executed.
1613 – The Time of Troubles comes to a close with the accession of Mikhail Romanov, son of Fyodor Romanov, who had been persecuted under Boris Godunov's reign.

The culpability of Boris in the matter of Dmitriy's death can neither be proven nor disproved. Karamzin, the historian to whom the drama is dedicated, accepted it as fact and Pushkin himself assumed it was true, at least for the purpose of creating a tragedy in the mold of Shakespeare. Modern historians, however, tend to acquit Boris of the crime.

Stage designs
The following gallery depicts the scene designs created by Matvey Shishkov for the first performance of the drama in 1870 at the Mariinsky Theatre, Saint Petersburg, Russia.

References

External links

 Website for Princeton University's production.  (Note: this server is very slow.)
 Online exhibition associated with Princeton University's production.

Plays by Aleksandr Pushkin
Plays adapted into operas
1831 plays
Plays set in Russia
Cultural depictions of Boris Godunov
Plays set in the 16th century
Plays set in the 17th century
Works about monarchs
Closet drama